The women's qualification for the 2000 Olympic women's basketball tournament occurred from 1998–2000; all five FIBA (International Basketball Federation) zones sent in teams.

The first qualifying tournament was the 1998 FIBA World Championship for Women in which the champion was guaranteed of a place in the Olympics. Throughout the next two years, several regional tournaments served as qualification for the zonal tournaments, which doubles as intercontinental championships, to determine which teams were to participate in the 2000 Sydney Summer Olympics.

Qualification

Outright qualification
Twelve teams took part in the Olympics, with each NOC sending in one team. The host nation (Australia) qualified automatically as hosts.

There are a total of 5 zonal tournaments (doubling as intercontinental championships) that determined the qualifying teams, with a total of 7 teams qualifying outright. Each zone was allocated with the following qualifying berths:
FIBA Africa: 1 team (champion)
FIBA Americas: 3 teams (champion, runner-up and third place)
FIBA Asia: 1 team (champion)
FIBA Europe: 4 teams (Top four places)
FIBA Oceania: 1 team (runner-up)

Furthermore, United States qualified automatically by winning at the 1998 FIBA World Championship for Women.

Summary

These are the final standings of the different Olympic qualifying tournaments. The venues are as follows:
1998 FIBA World Championship for Women: Berlin (Germany)
1997 FIBA Africa Championship for Women: Nairobi (Kenya)
1999 FIBA Americas Championship for Women: Havana (Cuba)
FIBA Asia Championship for Women 1999: Shizuoka (Japan)
EuroBasket Women 1999: Warsaw (Poland)
1997 FIBA Oceania Championship for Women: Auckland (New Zealand)

Qualified teams

References

Basketball at the 2000 Summer Olympics – Women's tournament
basketball
2000